Emil Bondev (born 19 August 1962) is a Bulgarian rower. He competed in the men's eight event at the 1988 Summer Olympics.

References

1962 births
Living people
Bulgarian male rowers
Olympic rowers of Bulgaria
Rowers at the 1988 Summer Olympics
Rowers from Sofia